Odd Is on Our Side is the second graphic novel featuring Dean Koontz's character Odd Thomas. It was released in October 2010. It is written by Fred Van Lente and Koontz, with illustrations by Queenie Chan in a manga style.

Plot summary

It is Halloween in Pico Mundo, California, and there is a whiff of something wicked in the autumn air. While the town prepares for its annual festivities, young fry cook Odd Thomas cannot shake the feeling that make-believe goblins and ghouls are not the only things on the prowl. And he should know, since he can see what others cannot: the spirits of the restless dead. But even his frequent visitor, the specter of Elvis Presley, cannot seem to point Odd in the right direction.

With the help of his gun-toting girlfriend, Stormy, Odd is out to uncover the terrible truth. Is something sinister afoot in the remote barn guarded by devilish masked men? Has All Hallows Eve mischief taken a malevolent turn? Or is the pleading ghost of a trick-or-treater a frightening omen of doom?

Characters

Odd Thomas
Odd Thomas is the protagonist of the Odd Thomas series. He is a short-order cook at the Pico Mundo grill, who has the ability to see the lingering dead. He uses this ability to try and bring peace to the ghosts he encounters, so that they can move on to the next life. Traumatic childhood experiences left him extremely uncomfortable with guns, so he relies on his resourcefulness to escape the sometimes hostile situations in which he finds himself.

Stormy Llewellyn
Stormy Llewellyn is Odd's girlfriend and soulmate. She grew up in an orphanage, except for a six-month stint in which she was adopted by a family, only to be sexually abused. Stormy intends to marry Odd, but she is waiting until she overcomes her traumatic past. She does not share Odd's fear of guns, and carries a pistol with which she provides backup for Odd on his adventures.

Chief Wyatt Porter
Wyatt Porter is the Chief of Police in Pico Mundo, and serves as a father figure to Odd. He is one of the few people who are aware of Odd's abilities, and has sometimes been able to catch elusive criminals with Odd's paranormal help.

Anachronisms
This graphic novel contradicts events in future novels, such as mentioning a Nintendo Wii, released four years after the first novel and Stormy's death.

References

External links

 

2010 graphic novels
American graphic novels
Comics based on fiction
Comics by Fred Van Lente
Novels by Dean Koontz
Original English-language manga
Del Rey Manga
Fiction books about precognition
Halloween novels